Paulo Antonio Mascarenhas Roxo O. Praem. (12 June 1928 – 1 June 2022) was a Brazilian Roman Catholic prelate.

Mascarenhas Roxo was born in Brazil and was ordained to the priesthood in 1952. He served as bishop of the Roman Catholic Diocese of Mogi das Cruzes, Brazil, from 1990 until his retirement in 2014.

References

1928 births
2022 deaths
Brazilian Roman Catholic bishops
Premonstratensian bishops
Bishops appointed by Pope John Paul II
People from Mogi das Cruzes